Alife Rivington Club is a shoe store located in the Lower East Side of Manhattan. Alife Rivington Club sells newly released, exclusive and limited-edition sneakers from companies such as Nike and Adidas.
The store is located at 158 Rivington St. Alife Rivington Club is meant to have a Harvard Club feel. The store has mahogany cubbies for each shoe, leather couches, and an outdoor courtyard. They also sell online.

References

External links
Alife Rivington Life

Shoe companies of the United States
Retail companies of the United States
Companies based in New York City